Engelbertus Pieter (Bert) de Jong (born 5 August 1945) is a Dutch politician, he was a member of the Dutch Senate from 8 June 1999 until 15 July 2000 for the Christian Democratic Appeal.

De Jong studied Dutch law at Utrecht University between 1963 and 1969. He earned his promotion at the same university in 1975. Since 1979 he has been a professor of social law at the Vrije Universiteit Amsterdam. He currently is president of the board of trustees of the Sociale Verzekeringsbank.

De Jong was made Knight of the Order of Orange-Nassau on 29 April 1997.

References

External links
  Parlement.com biography

1945 births
Living people
People from Zaanstad
Utrecht University alumni
Academic staff of Vrije Universiteit Amsterdam
Christian Democratic Appeal politicians
Members of the Senate (Netherlands)
Knights of the Order of Orange-Nassau